is a Japanese film producer who is the founder, president, and chief executive officer of the Japanese production company, Cine Bazar.

Life and career 
Born in 1959 in Nitta, Genkai, Saga, Japan. After graduating from Meiji University, Wadakura became a film producer and founded the production company Cine Bazar in 1994, which he currently serves as president and CEO.

Wadakura has produced several live-action films in his career, including: Hiroshima, Swallowtail Butterfly, Cat's Eye, Love/Juice, Party 7, Calmi Cuori Appassionati, The Taste of Tea, Saiyūki, Hero (2007), The Magic Hour, Suspect X, Amalfi: Rewards of the Goddess, Sideways, Andalucia: Revenge of the Goddess, A Ghost of a Chance, The Kiyosu Conference, Hero (2015), Persona Non Grata, Shin Godzilla, Bleach, Masquerade Hotel, Hit Me Anyone One More Time, Shin Ultraman, and the upcoming film, Shin Kamen Rider. Along with various other film producers, he served as executive producer for the 2019 film Diner, as well as for several other films including Key of Life, Persona Non Grata, and A Gambler's Odyssey 2020. Wadakura also made a cameo as an elderly fisherman in The Fast and the Furious: Tokyo Drift, for which he served as the line producer for the Tokyo production crew.

Filmography

Producer

 The Stairway to the Distant Past (1995)
 Hiroshima (1995)
 Swallowtail Butterfly (1996)
 The Breath (1996)
 Cat's Eye (1997)
 Mabui (1999)
 Love/Juice (2000)
 Party 7 (2000)
 Calmi Cuori Appassionati (2001)
 Current Lover (2002)
 The Taste of Tea (2004)
 Nin x Nin: Ninja Hattori-kun, the Movie (2004)
 Shining Boy & Little Randy (2005)
 Check It Out, Yo! (2006)
 Back to the Bubble Era! Time Machine Drum Style (2007)
 Argentine Baba (2007)
 Saiyūki (2007) [with Yoshihiro Suzuki and Yasushi Ogawa]
 Hero (2007)
 My Darling of the Mountains (2008)
 The Magic Hour (2008)
 Suspect X (2008)
 I Want to Be a Shellfish (2008)
 Amalfi: Rewards of the Goddess (2009)
 Sideways (2009)
 Nodame Cantabile: The Movie I (2009)
 Nodame Cantabile: The Movie II (2010)
 Andalucia: Revenge of the Goddess (2011)
 A Ghost of a Chance (2011)
 LOVE: Masao-kun ga Iku! (2012)
 Orpheus' Lyre (2013)
 Maruyama, the Middle Schooler (2013) [with Makiko Nagasaka and Makoto Okada]
 Ataru: the First Love & the Last Kill (2013)
 The Apology King (2013)
 The Kiyosu Conference (2013)
 Hero (2015)
 Galaxy Kaido (2015)
 Persona Non Grata (2015)
 Shin Godzilla (2016)
 The Anthem of the Heart (2017)
 Bleach (2018)
 Masquerade Hotel (2019)
 Hit Me Anyone One More Time (2019)
 Way to Find the Best Life (2019)
 Caution, Hazardous Wife: The Movie (2021)
 Masquerade Night (2021)
 Radiation House: The Movie (2022)
 Shin Ultraman (2022)
 Shin Kamen Rider (2023)

Executive producer/production
 Key of Life (2012)
 Pieta in the Toilet (2015)
 Persona Non Grata (2015)
 A Gambler's Odyssey 2020 (2019)
 Diner (2019)

Co-producer
 Millennium Traveler (1999)
 Koi ni utaeba (2002)

Assistant producer
 Fuyajo (1998)

Line producer
 The Fast and the Furious: Tokyo Drift (2006)

Actor
 Stereo Future SF episode 2002 (2001) as film producer
 The Fast and the Furious: Tokyo Drift (2006) as elderly fisherman

Notes

References

External links

 

Interview with Wadakura at Nikkatsu

Japanese film producers
1959 births
Living people
People from Saga Prefecture
Japanese chief executives
Japanese company founders